Back Young-chul (born 11 November 1978) is a South Korean former football midfielder, who currently is the Coach of Daegu FC's U-15 team.

Club career
Back made his professional debut for Seongnam Ilhwa Chunma in 2001, playing a number of games in 2001 and 2002. However, he saw less game time in the next two seasons, and transferred to Pohang Steelers for 2005. He played two seasons for Gyeongnam FC from 2006, before joining his current club, Daegu FC in 2008. After regular appearances during the 2008 and 2009 seasons, Back had limited game time during the 2010 season. Following the conclusion of the 2010 season, he retired from playing football. However, he remains with Daegu as the coach of their U-15 side.

International career
Back was a member of the South Korea U-20 side in 1996, but has not played at senior level for South Korea.

Club career statistics

External links

1978 births
Living people
Association football midfielders
South Korean footballers
Seongnam FC players
Pohang Steelers players
Gyeongnam FC players
Daegu FC players
K League 1 players